Catlett is a surname. Notable people with the surname include:

Buddy Catlett (1933–2014), American jazz saxophonist
Charlie Catlett (born 1960), American computer scientist
Elizabeth Catlett (1915–2012), African-American graphic artist and sculptor
Gale Catlett (born 1940), American basketball coach
George Catlett Marshall Jr. (1880–1959), American statesman and soldier
John Catlett, American politician
Juan Mora Catlett (born 1939), Mexican film and documentary director
Kyle Catlett, American actor
Mary Jo Catlett (born 1938), American actress and comedian
Sid Catlett (1910–1951), American jazz drummer
Walter Catlett (1889–1960), American actor